The 2020 Mississippi State Bulldogs football team represented Mississippi State University in the 2020 NCAA Division I FBS football season. The Bulldogs played their home games at Davis Wade Stadium in Starkville, Mississippi, and competed in the Western Division of the Southeastern Conference (SEC). They were led by first-year head coach Mike Leach.

In a season impacted by the COVID-19 pandemic, the Bulldogs compiled a 3–7 record in a 10-game all-SEC schedule. As the NCAA had waived bowl eligibility requirements for the season, the Bulldogs received an invitation to the Armed Forces Bowl where they defeated Tulsa, becoming one of the few bowl teams with a losing record to record a bowl victory.

Previous season
The Bulldogs finished the 2019 season with a 6–7 record, including a 3–5 record in SEC play to finish fifth in the Western Division. They were invited to play in the Music City Bowl, where they lost against Louisville. Joe Moorhead was fired in January 2020, several days after the bowl.

SEC Media Days
In the preseason media poll, Mississippi State was predicted to finish in a tie for fifth place in the West Division.

Schedule
Mississippi State announced its 2020 football schedule on August 7, 2019. The 2020 schedule consisted of 7 home and 5 away games in the regular season.

The Bulldogs had games scheduled against Alabama A&M, New Mexico, NC State, and Tulane, but were canceled due to the COVID-19 pandemic.

The game between Auburn and Mississippi State was postponed due to an outbreak of COVID-19 on the Mississippi State team.  The game was originally scheduled for November 14.
Schedule Source:

Rankings

Game summaries

at No. 6 LSU

Sources:

Arkansas

Statistics

at Kentucky

Statistics

No. 11 Texas A&M

Statistics

at No. 2 Alabama

Statistics

Vanderbilt

Statistics

at No. 13 Georgia

Statistics

at Ole Miss

Statistics

Auburn

Statistics

Missouri

Statistics

vs. No. 24 Tulsa (Armed Forces Bowl)

Statistics

Players drafted into the NFL

References

Mississippi State
Mississippi State Bulldogs football seasons
Armed Forces Bowl champion seasons
Mississippi State Bulldogs football